Jangaon Assembly constituency is a constituency of Telangana Legislative Assembly, India. It is one of 3 constituencies in Jangaon district and 12 constituencies in undivided Warangal district. It is part of Bhuvanagiri Lok Sabha constituency.

Muthireddy Yadagiri Reddy of Telangana Rashtra Samithi is the current MLA of the constituency.

Overview

Jangaon Assembly Constituency was created in 1952,when it was one of the 175 total Assembly Constituencies of Hyderabad Legislative Assembly. Jangaon was under different Lok Sabha constituencies every time delimitation occurred.

Delimitation History 

Following villages were included in Jangaon Assembly constituency during delimitation every time.

Mandals
The Assembly Constituency presently comprises the following Mandals:

 Tharigoppula created by splitting Narmetta Mandal
 Komuravelli created by splitting Cherial Mandal

Members of the Legislative Assembly

Hyderabad

Andhra Pradesh

Telangana

Election results

2018

2014

See also
 List of constituencies of Telangana Legislative Assembly

References

External links
 Telangana Assembly Election Results (constituency Wise): Jangaon
 

Assembly constituencies of Telangana
Hanamkonda district
Jangaon district